The European Commission Representation in Ireland is part of the Commission’s network of representative offices throughout the Member States of the European Union. It is the Commission’s voice in Ireland and aims to communicate EU affairs at both national and local levels.

The Director of the Representation is Mr Gerard Kiely. He represents the European Commission in Ireland and reports back to the Commission on developments in Ireland.

Purpose
To this end, the Representation team has the following functions:

Communicating 
Providing information on European affairs both to the media and to the general public. The Press Office keeps national and local media up to date with developments in Brussels and is an important contact point for journalists. 
Providing the general public with free access to information about the Commission and the European Union in our public information centre at 12-14 Lower Mount Street, Dublin 2, through publications, multimedia facilities and educational visits. Information officers are on hand to deal with specific queries.
Providing a Your Europe Adviser (solicitor: Siobhan Duffy) who is available to give advice and information on citizens’ rights in the European Union. Ms. Duffy is available for consultation sessions for a half day each month. 
Distributing a weekly electronic newsletter with news of recent developments at EU level and an agenda of upcoming events.

Going Local 
Supporting a countrywide network of EU information providers in local libraries, business information centres and universities.

Listening
Gathering information and keeping the Commission in Brussels informed of various political, social and economic developments in Ireland. As part of its expanding listening function, the Representation will conduct public consultations on various ideas the Commission is developing. It wants to ensure that citizens’ voices are heard in EU decision making.

The website of the Representation is www.euireland.ie. The Representation can also be found on Facebook and Twitter.

References

European Commission
Ireland and the European Union